Patrick Francis "Pat" Manning, Jr. (born May 6, 1967, in Poughkeepsie, New York) was a five time member of the U.S. National Rowing Team.  He competed in the 1992 Olympics in Barcelona in the men's heavyweight coxless four and won a silver medal.

He attended and was a member of the rowing team at Franklin Delano Roosevelt High School in Hyde Park, New York, graduating in 1985. He is a 1990 summa cum laude graduate of Northeastern University and was elected to the school's Hall of Fame in 2000.  He graduated from the Harvard Business School in 1994 and is currently a partner at Bain & Company in London.

Published in Forbes Patrick talks about how 8% of Olympic rowers wound up landing top jobs at public companies, investment banks, and law and consulting firms, or starting their own companies.

References 

 
 
 Pat Manning at Bain.com
 Patrick Manning at LinkedIn

1967 births
Living people
Sportspeople from Poughkeepsie, New York
Rowers at the 1992 Summer Olympics
Olympic silver medalists for the United States in rowing
American male rowers
World Rowing Championships medalists for the United States
Medalists at the 1992 Summer Olympics
Harvard Business School alumni